Rebecca Anne Womeldorf is an American lawyer serving as the reporter of decisions of the Supreme Court of the United States. Womeldorf was appointed in December 2020 and began her service in January 2021. She is the second woman to hold the position.

Education
Womeldorf earned her Bachelor of Arts degree from Rhodes College in 1988 and Juris Doctor from the Washington and Lee University School of Law in 1991, graduating summa cum laude. She also served as law clerk to Supreme Court Justices Lewis F. Powell Jr. (retired) and Anthony Kennedy.

Career
Womeldorf practiced law in Washington, D.C. as a litigation partner at Hollingsworth LLP from 1999 until 2015.
She then served as Secretary and chief counsel to the Committee on Rules of Practice and Procedure of the Judicial Conference of the United States through early 2021, overseeing staff responsible for providing administrative, legal, and technical support to the committee and its advisory committees.

See also 
 List of law clerks of the Supreme Court of the United States (Seat 1)

References

Living people
20th-century American women lawyers
20th-century American lawyers
21st-century American women lawyers
21st-century American lawyers
Law clerks of the Supreme Court of the United States
Reporters of Decisions of the Supreme Court of the United States
Rhodes College alumni
Washington and Lee University School of Law alumni
Year of birth missing (living people)